William Bestick was an American professional baseball player in the early 1870s.  He appeared in four games with the  Brooklyn Eckfords, three of which as the catcher.  In 14 at bats, he collected four hits for a .286 batting average.  It is not known when or where he was born, nor when he died.  Peter Morris, a baseball historian for SABR, claims that the only known man by this name that has been found, died on July 28, 1911 in New York, NY.

References

Major League Baseball catchers
Baseball players from New York (state)
Brooklyn Eckfords players
Year of birth unknown
Year of death unknown
19th-century baseball players